XEVOZ-AM is a radio station in Mexico City, with its transmitter at San José Puente de Vigas, Tlalnepantla, State of Mexico, Mexico. Broadcasting on 1590 AM.

History

The first concession for 1590 AM was made in 1944 for XEMC-AM, made to Dolores G. Estrada de Ferreiro. During its early years, it broadcast Spanish music.

In 1963, Grupo ACIR bought the station and changed its calls to XEVOZ-AM. Under ACIR it became "Radio Voz" and broadcast tropical music. The format remained until 1989, when the station became "Radio ACIR", a format moved to XEL-AM not long after. XEVOZ in turn received the name "Capital Radio" and a rock format; the station was soon renamed "Capital Heavy Radio". The next 15 years would be marked by a carousel of formats: "Radio Capital" with tropical and norteña music (1995-1996); the short-lived "Óxido" rock format that was moved to XEFR-AM months later; ranchera music as "Bonita 1590" (1996-2004): "Radio Reloj", news with time announcements every minute (2004–06, during the brief window that XEQK-AM was not on its similar format); "Radio Tráfico", traffic conditions for Mexico City (2006–08); and "Luz 1590" with Christian pop (2008–09, being so far one of only two stations to broadcast Christian music in Mexico City, alongside XEUR-AM which had that format for a brief time in 2010).

In 2009 ACIR shed many of its stations, with Radiorama buying all of them. Under Radiorama XEVOZ had five different formats and names in 2010: "Radio 1590" with Spanish rock (January); "Radio Fiesta", a name used formerly on XEUR-AM (January–May); "Vida 1590" with contemporary music in Spanish and English; and finally, regional Mexican as "Radio Mexicana 1590" from June 1, 2010, changed to "La Mexicana 1590" in October.

In mid-2016, XEVOZ flipped from Regional Mexican to pop as "@1590". On November 12, 2021, XEVOZ switched back to the tropical music format as Buenisiima, a brand belonging to Grupo Audiorama Comunicaciones.

References

1944 establishments in Mexico
Grupo Radiorama
Radio stations established in 1944
Radio stations in Mexico City
Radio stations in the State of Mexico
Tropical music radio stations
Spanish-language radio stations